= Talfara =

Village in Rajasthan, India

Talfara (also Talaphara) is a village in Rajasthan, India.
